Somassi may refer to:

 Somassi, Bazèga, Burkina Faso
 Somassi, Boulkiemdé, Burkina Faso